Arnis Veidemanis is a Latvian curler, curling coach and former darts player.

At the national level, he is a Latvian men's champion curler (2021), two-time Latvian mixed champion curler (2013, 2014) and two-time Latvian mixed doubles champion curler (2014, 2020).

Teams

Men's

Mixed

Mixed doubles

Record as a coach of national teams

References

External links

 
 
 
 
 
 Arnis Veidemanis photos - sportfoto.com
 Video: 

Living people

Latvian male curlers
Latvian curling champions
Latvian curling coaches
Latvian darts players
Year of birth missing (living people)
Place of birth missing (living people)
21st-century Latvian people